The Torneo Gran Alternativa (2009) was a professional wrestling  major show event produced by Consejo Mundial de Lucha Libre (CMLL) that took place on September 26, 2009 in Arena Mexico, Mexico City, Mexico. The show featured the 2009 version of CMLL's Torneo Gran Alternativa (Spanish for "the Great Alternative tournament), a tournament where an established CMLL star teams with a Novato or rookie in a tag team tournament. None of the Novatos in the 2009 tournament had participated in previous Gran Alternativas. The teams were Místico and Ángel de Oro, Blue Panther and Rey Cometa, Héctor Garza and Ángel de Plata, Atlantis and Camorra, Mr. Niebla and Tiger Kid, Averno and Pólvora, Toscano and Rouge and finally Yujiro and Shigeo Okumura. Shocker was originally scheduled to team with Rouge and Semental was supposed to team with Yujiro but both were replaced before the show. In addition to the seven match tournament the card featured two title matches; Último Guerrero defending the CMLL World Heavyweight Championship against Jushin Thunder Liger in the main event and Pierrothito defending the Mexican National Lightweight Championship against Eléctrico on the under card. THe show featured two additional Six-man tag team matches.

Background
The event featured eleven professional wrestling matches with different wrestlers involved in pre-existing scripted feuds or storylines. Wrestlers portray either villains (referred to as Rudos in Mexico) or fan favorites (Técnicos in Mexico) as they compete in wrestling matches with pre-determined outcomes.

Results

References

Specific match result sources

General sources

Further reading

Show previews

2009 in professional wrestling
CMLL Torneo Gran Alternativa
September 2009 events in Mexico
2009 in Mexico